Rachel Sternberg is an English voice actress. She is known for her voice-acting role as Hermione Granger in the 2009 video game of Harry Potter and the Half-Blood Prince. She also played a role in Jeff Wayne's Musical Version of The War of the Worlds.

Filmography
Jeff Wayne's Musical Version of The War of the Worlds (2006) - Additional voices
Harry Potter and the Half-Blood Prince (2009) - Hermione Granger

References

External links
 

Living people
English video game actresses
Year of birth missing (living people)